Kathleen P. Deignan, CND, (born 17 December 1947), is an Irish-American theologian, author and songwriter of contemporary liturgical music. A Sister of the Congregation of Notre Dame, she is composer-in-residence for Schola Ministries and is the founding  director of  the Deignan Institute for Earth and Spirit Institute at Iona College, New York.  She previously directed the Iona Institute for Peace and Justice Studies in Ireland. Deignan is a GreenFaith Fellow who completed an intensive training in religious environmental leadership.  Her work in this area focuses on the legacy of Father Thomas Berry.  She is Emerita President of the International Thomas Merton Society and a Board Member of the American Teilhard Association.  She is an author, public speaker, and environmental advocate.

Biography
Deignan is Emerita Professor of Religious Studies at Iona College, and the founding director of the Kathleen Deignan, CND Institute for Earth and Spirit.. She received her master's degree in Spirituality Studies and her doctorate in Historical Theology from Fordham University in New York, where she was to later be awarded the university's Sapientia et Doctrina Award for her service to renewal of the church in 2009. She is the author of Christ Spirit: The Eschatology of Shaker Christianity and writes and lectures widely on classical and contemporary spirituality, particularly the legacy of Thomas Merton. She is the author of When the Trees Say Nothing: Writings on Nature, Thomas Merton: A Book of Hours, and she also released a two-disc CD "A Book of Hours: At Prayer with Thomas Merton".

She has composed over two hundred songs for worship and prayer, and she has been part of two liturgical ensembles. Along with Evelyn Avoglia she founded Schola Ministries a publishing and performing project where she is composer-in-residence.  This ministry which began with the worship community at Sacred Heart University, was located at the Benedictine Grange,  where she was composer in residence and leader of the ensemble Anima Schola until the closure of Benedictine Grange in 2018.  Her music is produced by producer, composer and performer Paul Avgerinos.

As a member of the Congregation of Notre Dame, founded by Saint Marguerite Bourgeoys, she is engaged in the mission of education, which at times is expressed in peace, social justice, and ecological justice concerns.  She initiated and formerly directed the Iona College Institute for Peace and Justice Studies in Ireland and the Iona College Spirituality Institute's Celtic Spirituality Pilgrimage to Ireland.

Deignan is also engaged in interfaith dialogue  with Jews, Muslims, and Buddhists. Her parents, Patrick Paul and Bridget, were born in Ireland and later emigrated to London where Kathleen was born. Another emigration brought the Deignans to New York City where Kathleen was raised on Manhattan's Upper West Side.

Her sister is Ann Deignan, a physician and poet.

One of Sr. Deignan's edited volumes of Thomas Merton's work was praised by the National Catholic Reporter.

Discography
1984 – A Garden Once Again: Songs in Celebration of Creation
1984 – Of Thanks and Wonder: 
1997 – Stations: Songs for the Paschal Journey
1998 – Borne by Grace: Songs of Contemplation and Praise
1999 – Bride Spirit: Songs of the Beloved
1999 – Visitation: Songs of the Congregation of Notre Dame
2000 – Pax Amor Christi: A Trinity of Songs
2000 – Sabbath: Songs for Worship
2002 – The Servant's Heart: Songs of Devotion
2003 – Returning: Songs for the Journey Home
2005 – Sentinel of the Invisible: Jeanne LeBer
2008 – The Gift: Songs of the Grateful Heart
2009 – A Book of Hours: At Prayer with Thomas Merton
2009 – Ave: Songs of the Congregation of Notre Dame
2010 – A Garden Once Again: Songs in Celebration of Creation

Bibliography
1992 – Christ Spirit: The Eschatology of Shaker Christianity. 
2003 – Thomas Merton,'When the Trees Say Nothing: Writings on Nature (edited by Kathleen Deignan). 
2007 – Thomas Merton: A Book of Hours. 
2009 – Thomas Merton: El Libro de las Horas. 
2009 – Thomas Merton: Księga godzin''.

References

External links
Official Website
Deignan's Posts on Huffington Post
Kathleen P. Deignan, Ph.D. – Profile at Iona College
Deignan's recordings on CD Baby

1948 births
Living people
Iona University alumni
Christian music songwriters
English emigrants to the United States
20th-century American Roman Catholic nuns
American theologians
Fordham University alumni
21st-century American Roman Catholic nuns